The Metropolitan Borough of Deptford was a Metropolitan borough in the County of London between 1900 and 1965, when it became part of the London Borough of Lewisham along with the Metropolitan Borough of Lewisham.

History
The borough covered the same area of the parish of Deptford St Paul, which had been separated from the neighbouring parish of Deptford St Nicholas  to its north in 1730. The rateable values of the two parishes had been roughly equal when they were separated, but St Paul contained all the farmland to the south, the majority of which was built on over the next 170 years.

When the Metropolitan Borough was created, consideration was given to reuniting the two parishes, but a closer equalisation of rateable value was served by uniting St Nicholas with Greenwich to the east.

The growth of the London conurbation had reached Deptford by the end of the eighteenth century but it had been a large industrial town well before this time: the Royal Docks and the Victualling Yard, which provisioned the Navy, and the various private dockyards, meant it was a prosperous and cosmopolitan town.

Deptford Town Hall was built between 1903 and 1905 on New Cross Road. The building is in a grand baroque style, featuring carvings of tritons and admirals to emphasise Deptford's maritime heritage. It is now used by Goldsmiths College.

Geography
The borough bordered Bermondsey, Greenwich, Lewisham and Camberwell.

Population and area
The population from each census was:

St Paul Deptford Civil Parish 1801–1899

Metropolitan Borough 1900–1961

Coat of arms
The borough did not have an officially granted coat of arms, instead using a device of their own design.

The three choughs in the first quarter represent the county of Surrey. They were taken from the arms of Onslow family, one-time lords of the manor of Guildford. The fourth quarter showed a white horse on red, representative of the county of Kent. Before 1889 the area of the borough was divided between the two counties. The second quarter showed a quarter ship on the stocks, for the naval dockyard. The remaining quarter of the shield was a portrait of Peter the Great of Russia, who learnt the art of naval architecture in Deptford.

Above the shield was a mural crown, representing municipal government. On either side was an heraldic dolphin entwining a trident.

Politics

Under the Metropolis Management Act 1855 any parish that exceeded 2,000 ratepayers was to be divided into wards; as such the parish of St Paul Deptford was divided into four wards (electing vestrymen): No. 1 or North (15), No. 2 or South (21), No. 3 or East (18) and No. 4 or West (18).

The metropolitan borough was divided into six wards for elections: East, North West, North, South East, South West and South.

Borough council

Parliament constituency
For elections to Parliament, the borough was represented by one constituency:
Deptford

References

Further reading
 

Metropolitan boroughs of the County of London
History of the London Borough of Lewisham
1900 establishments in the United Kingdom
1965 disestablishments in the United Kingdom
Metropolitan Borough of
Districts abolished by the London Government Act 1963